The United States Army Medical Command, Europe (USAMEDCOMEUR) provided Echelon/Roles 3 and 4 Health Service Support to units of the United States Army Europe. It was a Table of Distribution and Allowances organization that consolidated Role 3 and 4 Health Service Support under a single command. Upon the inactivation of the United States Army Medical Command, Europe in 1978, the Role 4 mission was assumed by the 7th Medical Command, while the Role 3 mission was assumed by the 68th Medical Group in support of the V Corps and the 30th Medical Group in support of the VII Corps.

Lineage
Organized in the Regular Army as Headquarters and Headquarters Company, United States Army Medical Command, Europe (Provisional) on 1 July 1968 in Germany
Constituted 1 January 1969 in the Regular Army as Headquarters and Headquarters Company, United States Army Medical Command, Europe and activated in Germany
Inactivated 21 September 1978 in Germany

History
The USAMEDCOMEUR was activated as a provisional organization in Heidelberg, Federal Republic of Germany, on 1 July 1968 as part of the Command, Control and Logistics System 1970. Initially assigned to USAMEDCOMEUR were the 9th Hospital Center, its hospitals, dispensaries and activities; the US Army Veterinary Detachment, Europe; the 8th Finance Disbursing Section; the 10th Medical Laboratory; the 26th Medical Detachment (Illustration); the USAREUR Medical Regulating Office; the 655th Medical Company (Blood Bank); the USAREUR Preventive Medicine Detachment; the 8000th Civilian Labor Group; and the Benelux (SHAPE) Medical Service Area.

The headquarters was organized by combining the personnel assigned to the Office of the Surgeon, HQ, USAREUR and Seventh Army with the HQ, US Army Communications Zone, Europe Hospital Center (Provisional) and elements of the HQ, 9th Hospital Center.

The commanding general of the medical command continued to serve as the theater surgeon and his staff provided medical support to HQ, USAREUR and Seventh Army. The Medical Command headquarters was located at Nachrichten Kasserne, Heidelberg, in the building formerly occupied by the 9th Hospital Center headquarters; the 9th Hospital Center headquarters, in turn, relocated to Marceau Kasserne, Landstuhl.

The Medical Command's mission was to provide health service support to the 400,000-plus military personnel and dependents and to have the capability to provide support to combat forces after the transition to combat operations.

Once fully operational, the command would control all medical functions, facilities, and resources in USAREUR and Seventh Army except those organic to major troop units. The reorganization was expected to provide greater flexibility in meeting requirements for the Army Medical Service in Europe, while health service support of "NATO committed forces" remained unchanged.

On 1 October 1968, the 7th Medical Brigade with its major units—the 30th and 31st Medical Groups and the 421st Medical Company (Air Ambulance)—was added to the Command. On that same date, the Medical Depot at Einsiedlerhof and the medical section of the Supply and Maintenance Agency were formed into the US Army Medical Materiel Center, Europe, marking the first time that all medical logistics functions in Europe were under the control of the USAREUR Chief Surgeon.

On 1 January 1969, the medical facilities in Berlin and those in Italy were assigned to USAMEDCOMEUR. The 9th Hospital Center was phased
down in December 1970, and hospitals in that command became Medical Department Activities (MEDDACs) reporting directly to USAMEDCOMEUR.
In March 1971, USAMEDCOMEUR became subordinate to the Theater Army Support Command (TASCOM), while the Office of the Chief Surgeon
remained an integral part of Headquarters, USAREUR. On 21 July 1973, the 7th Medical Brigade was inactivated and the 30th and 31st Medical
Groups, the 421st Medical Company and all other units subordinate to the 7th Medical Brigade were assigned directly to USAMEDCOMEUR.

On 1 July 1973, USAMEDCOMEUR was relieved from assignment to TASCOM and became a major subordinate command of USAREUR. On 1 July 1974,
the Teheran MEDDAC was activated and assumed responsibility for Army medical support in the Middle East area. On 1 April 1975, the
31st Medical Group was inactivated, placing all combat support hospitals and other field medical units under the 30th Medical
Group.

Shoulder Sleeve Insignia

Description
On a maroon octagon 2 1/4 inches (5.72 cm) in height and 2/14 inches (5.72 cm) in width a white Maltese cross with a white square at its center charged with a blue five-pointed star with one point up.

Symbolism 
White and maroon are the colors of the Medical Department.  The Maltese cross is a symbol which has been associated with medicine since medieval times as an emblem of the Knights Hospitallers.  The octagon is symbolic of health and regeneration, and the star alludes to the command function.

Background 
The shoulder sleeve insignia was approved on 6 May 1970.  (TIOH Dwg. No. A-1-538)

Distinctive Unit Insignia
No Distinctive unit insignia was authorized for the United States Army Medical Command, Europe by the United States Army Institute of Heraldry.

Combat Service Identification Badge
No Combat Service Identification Badge was authorized for the United States Army Medical Command, Europe by the United States Army Institute of Heraldry.

Commanders
All commanders of the 7th Medical Command were Medical Corps officers.

References

Medical units and formations of the United States Army
Army
Military units and formations established in 1968
Military units and formations disestablished in 1978